Susan Ariel Aaronson is an American author, public speaker and an academic professor whose works are centred on the relationship between economic change and human rights and more recently focuses on data. She is a research professor at the Elliott School of International Affairs at George Washington University, where she also founded the Digital Trade and Data Governance Hub of which she is director.

Aaronson is also senior fellow at the Centre for International Governance Innovation and, previously, served as a fellow of the World Trade Institute during 2008 to 2012.

Education
Aaronson received her B.A. in history from Binghamton University, graduating magna cum laude as a member of Phi Beta Kappa. She graduated from Columbia University with an M.I.A. and M.A. in Political Science and International Affairs and from Johns Hopkins University in 1993 with an M.A. and PhD in Economic and Business History.

Works
Published works by Susan Ariel Aaronson include:
For the People, But Not by the People: A History of the International Trade Organization (ITO) (1993)

Taking trade to the streets (2001)
The Lost History of Public Efforts to Shape Globalization. (2002)
Trade Imbalance: The Struggle to Weigh Human Rights Concerns in Trade Policymaking. (2007)
Trade and the American Dream: A Social History of Postwar Trade Policy. (2015)
Why Trade Agreements are not Setting Information Free: The Lost History and Reinvigorated Debate over Cross-Border Data Flows, Human Rights and National Security (2015)
Protectionism (2016)
The Trump administration’s approach to artificial intelligence is not that smart: it’s about cooperation, not domination (2019)
Artificial Intelligence and Data. Foreign Policy Association. (2019–20)
Data is disruptive: How data sovereignty is challenging data governance (2021)
Data Is Different, So Policymakers Should Pay Close Attention to Its Governance (2021)
The West Can Make Russia a Trade Pariah with a Page from Moscow’s Playbook

References

Johns Hopkins University alumni
George Washington University faculty
Elliott School of International Affairs faculty
School of International and Public Affairs, Columbia University alumni
Binghamton University alumni
Living people
Year of birth missing (living people)